Grand Isle is a 1991 film directed by Mary Lambert. It is based on the early feminist novel The Awakening by Kate Chopin, first published in 1899. It starred Kelly McGillis as Edna Pontellier, Jon DeVries as Léonce Pontellier and Adrian Pasdar as Robert Lebrun.

References

External links
 
 

1991 films
Films directed by Mary Lambert
1991 drama films
Films scored by Elliot Goldenthal
Films based on American novels
1990s English-language films